Major Courage Emmanuel Kobla Quashigah (9 September 1947 – 5 January 2010) was a Ghanaian soldier and politician. He held many prominent positions in the Ghana Armed Forces and was a Minister of State for Agriculture and later Health in the NPP government of John Kufuor between 2001 and 2009.

Early life and education
Quashigah was born at Kedzi in the Volta Region of Ghana. He had his secondary and sixth form education at the Keta Secondary School also in the Volta Region. He gained his GCE Ordinary Level and GCE Advanced Level certificates there. He proceeded to the United Kingdom where he studied at the Royal Military Academy at Sandhurst. He qualified with a Diploma in Economics, War studies and Communication studies. He was awarded the  Cane and Certificate of Honour as Best Overseas Cadet and Highest in the Order of Merit at Sandhurst.

Military career
Quashigah served as an Intelligence officer at the headquarters of the Second Infantry Brigade of the Ghana Army based at Kumasi in the Ashanti Region of Ghana. He was a Platoon Commander/Instructor at Junior Leaders Company, a.k.a. Boys Company in Kumasi. He then became the Chief Instructor at the Jungle Warfare School at Akyease, in the Eastern Region. Other positions later held by him include Commanding Officer of the Ghana Military Police and Commanding Officer of the Forces Reserve Battalion. He has also served as a Director at the Military Academy and Training School at Teshie, a suburb of Accra. Quashigah distinguished himself in various fields in the army. After serving with the United Nations Interim Force in Lebanon, he won a Commendation for Efficient and Effective Command.

Politics
During the military rule of the Provisional National Defence Council (PNDC), he was the Chief Operations Officer at the (PNDC) Headquarters, Gonjar Barracks, Burma Camp, Accra. He has also served as a Member of the Police Council of Ghana. Quashigah was formerly a close ally of Jerry Rawlings, Head of state of Ghana and chairman of the PNDC. On September 24, 1989, Quashigah and four others were arrested for allegedly plotting to overthrow the PNDC government. He was finally released in 1992. In 1998, he became the national organiser of the New Patriotic Party (NPP).  After the NPP formed a government in January 2001, Quashigah was appointed Minister of Agriculture. He was appointed Health Minister after a cabinet reshuffle in 2005 after President Kufuor had been reelected in the December 2000 presidential election. Whilst serving as minister of Health, Quashigah received notable recognition for outstanding and exceptional contribution towards initiating a national health education on healthy lifestyle living and nutrition in Ghana and his efforts has grandly become extremely successful since the Africa Union has called on member states to declare the last Friday of each year as Africa's Healthy Lifestyles Day. Subsequently Ghana has named Ghana's Former Minister for Health, Major Quashigah, FGNAHAF as Africa's Best Health Minister in recent times and Ghanaians should be proud.

Personal life 
He was married to Gertrude Quashigah, the CEO of Ambar Quality Foods Limited and the National Coordinator of the School Feeding Program.

Death
Quashigah traveled to Israel during a short illness for some public engagements and to seek medical attention but died during his trip.

References

External sources
Profile on Ghanaweb.com
Quashigah's death on Ghanaweb.com

1947 births
2010 deaths
Ghanaian soldiers
Ghanaian military personnel
Graduates of the Royal Military Academy Sandhurst
Agriculture ministers of Ghana
Health ministers of Ghana
New Patriotic Party politicians